Ein Schloß am Wörthersee is a German–Austrian comedy television series made by Lisa Film and RTL, known internationally as Lakeside Hotel.

The series ran for 33 episodes in 3 seasons from 1990 to 1992, followed by a 90-minute special in 1993.

Ein Schloß is known for its many guest stars, among them Peter Kraus, Ottfried Fischer, Hans Clarin, Zachi Noy and Georg Thomalla, and internationally known actors and musicians Falco, the Knef, Telly Savalas, Larry Hagman, Linda Gray, Nina Hagen and David Cassidy.

Hansi Kraus reprised his role as Pepe Nietnagel from Zur Hölle mit den Paukern and sequels, in 3 episodes.

See also
List of German television series

External links
 

Television shows set in Austria
1990 German television series debuts
1992 German television series endings
German-language television shows
RTL (German TV channel) original programming